Top Model, cycle 11 is the eleventh cycle of an ongoing reality television series based on Tyra Banks' America's Next Top Model that pits contestants from Poland against each other in a variety of competitions to determine who will win the title of the next Polish Top Model.

Joanna Krupa, who also serves as the lead judge, returned to host the eleventh cycle. Other judges included fashion designer Dawid Woliński, fashion show director Kasia Sokołowska and photographer Marcin Tyszka. This is the eighth season of the show to feature male contestants.

Among the prizes for the season are a contract with D'Vision Models Management, an appearance on the cover of the Polish issue of Glamour, and 100,000 złotys (US$30,000).

The international destinations of this cycle were Cape Town, Johannesburg and Punta Cana.  The winner of the competition was 22-year-old Klaudia Nieścior from Tarnobrzeg.

Contestants 
(Ages stated are at start of contest)

Episodes

Episode 1
Original airdate: 

Auditions for the eleventh season of Top Model begin, and aspiring hopefuls are chosen for the semi-final round.

Episode 2
Original airdate: 

In the semi-finals, the judges begin to eliminate contestants to narrow the number of models who will battle it out for a place in the top model house.

Golden ticket winner: Ola Helis

Episode 3
Original airdate: 

In the season's third and final casting episode, the judges chose the finalists who will move on to the main competition out of the remaining pool of contestants.

Silver ticket winner: Fabian Sokołowski
Featured photographer: Marcin Tyszka
Guest judge: Peyman Amin

Episode 4
Original airdate: 

Challenge winner: Martyna Kaczmarek & Natalia Woś 
First call-out: Weronika Pawelec 
Bottom three: Karolina Kuracińska, Krystian Embradora & Marcelina Zetler 
Eliminated: Karolina Kuracińska
Featured photographer: Marcin Tyszka
Guest judge: Monika Jac Jagaciak
Special guests: Marek Sierzputowski, Kasia Dąbrowska, Jan Kryszczak

Episode 5
Original airdate: 

First challenge winners: Maciej Skiba & Michalina Wojciechowska
Second challenge winners: Adrian Nkwamu, Adriana Hyzopska, Martyna Kaczmarek & Weronika Pawelec 
First call-out: Klaudia Nieścior
Bottom three: Maciej Skiba, Marcelina Zetler & Ola Helis
Eliminated: Marcelina Zetler
Featured photographer: Aleksandra Modrzejewska (shoot)
Guest judge: Marianna Gierszewska
Special guests: Dominika Wysocka, Kamil Kotarba, Kasia Dąbrowska, Aleksander Ryzow, Klaudia El Dursi, Kasia Zillmann, Magdalena Piotrowska

Episode 6
Original airdate: 

Booked for a job: Adrian Nkwamu, Adriana Hyzopska, Borys Barchan , Krystian Embradora, Maciej Skiba, Martyna Kaczmarek, Michalina Wojciechowska, Natalia Woś & Weronika Pawelec 
Challenge winner: Natalia Woś 
First call-out: Natalia Woś 
Bottom three: Maciej Skiba, Martyna Kaczmarek & Weronika Pawelec 
Saved: Maciej Skiba
Featured photographer: Borys Synak
Guest judges: Aleksandra Adamska & Jessica Mercedes Kirschner
Special guests: Gosia Baczyńska, Mariusz Przybylski, Jon Reyman

Episode 7
Original airdate: 

Challenge winners: Maciej Skiba & Michalina Wojciechowska
First call-out: Ola Hellis
Bottom three: Borys Barchan, Filip Ferner & Krystian Embradora
Eliminated: Krystian Embradora
Featured director: Natasza Parzymies
Guest judges: Natasza Parzymies
Special guests: Kilian Kerner, Sylwia Lipka, Michał Czernecki, MROZU, Filip Pasternak

Episode 8
Original airdate: 

First challenge winners: Filip Ferner & Martyna Kaczmarek
Second challenge winners: Adrian Nkwamu, Adriana Hyzopska & Borys Barchan
First call-out: Borys Barchan & Natalia Woś 
Bottom three: Adriana Hyzopska, Filip Ferner & Weronika Pawelec 
Eliminated: Filip Ferner
Featured photographer: Kasia Bielska
Guest judges: Maria Dębska & Kasia Dąbrowska
Special guests: Paweł Szkolik, Rúrik Gíslason, Sophie Trelles-Tvede, Daniel Tracz, Mateusz Mil, Kasia Szklarczyk, Dawid Woskanian, Ernest Morawski, Łukasz Bogusławski, Mariusz Jakubowski, Patrycja Sobolewska, Dominika Wysocka, Nicole Akonchong, Arek Pydych

Episode 9
Original airdate: 

Challenge winners: Adrian Nkwamu & Ola Helis
First call-out: Maciej Skiba
Bottom three: Adrian Nkwamu, Klaudia Nieścior & Martyna Kaczmarek
Eliminated: Martyna Kaczmarek
Featured director: Tala Dołgowska️️
Guest judges: Maja Zimnoch & Paulina Krupińska
Special guests: Anna Aksamitowska, Maja Bączyńska, Mateusz Jagodziński, Natalia Ślizowska, Monika Prus, Sylwia Butor, Ewa Sadowska, Julia Pośnik, Kuba Grochmalski, Aga Konopka

Episode 10
Original airdate: 

First challenge winners: Maciej Skiba, Natalia Woś & Ola Helis
Second challenge winners: Adrian Nkwamu, Natalia Woś & Ola Helis
First call-out: Klaudia Nieścior
Bottom three: Adrian Nkwamu, Adriana Hyzopska & Weronika Pawelec 
Eliminated: Adrian Nkwamu & Weronika Pawelec 
Featured photographer: Gosia Turczyńska
Guest judges: Joanna Lorynowicz & Maja Sieroń
Special guests: Maja Salamon, Tobias Berg, Mateusz Stankiewicz, Przemek Dzienis, Żabson, Karolina Limbach

Episode 11
Original airdate: 

First challenge winners: Michalina Wojciechowska & Natalia Woś
Second challenge winners: Klaudia Nieścior & Natalia Woś
First call-out: Borys Barchan
Bottom three: Maciej Skiba, Michalina Wojciechowska & Ola Helis
Eliminated: Ola Helis
Featured photographer: Michael Oliver Love
Guest judge: Carol Bouwer
Special guests: Wade Schouw, Kim Gush, Nikita Wesgate, Jessica Murray, Calista De Luz

Episode 12
Original airdate: 

Challenge winner: 
First call-out: Natalia Woś
Bottom three: Adriana Hyzopska, Maciej Skiba & Michalina Wojciechowska
Originally eliminated: Michalina Wojciechowska
Featured photographer: 
Guest judge: 
Special guests:

Episode 13
Original airdate: 

Challenge winner: 
First call-out: Natalia Woś
Bottom four: Adriana Hyzopska, Borys Barchan, Maciej Skiba & Klaudia Nieścior
Eliminated: Adriana Hyzopska, Borys Barchan & Maciej Skiba
Featured photographer: 
Guest judge: Carol Bouwer
Special guests: Wade Schouw, Kim Gush, Nikita Wesgate, Jessica Murray, Calista De Luz

Episode 14
Original airdate: 

Final three: Klaudia Nieścior, Michalina Wojciechowska & Natalia Woś
Eliminated: Michalina Wojciechowska
Final two: Klaudia Nieścior & Natalia Woś
Poland's Next Top Model: Klaudia Nieścior
Featured photographer: 
Guest judge: 
Special guests:

Episode 15
Original airdate: 

Recap episode.

Results 

 The contestant was immune from elimination.
 The contestant was originally eliminated but was saved
 The contestant was eliminated.

Bottom Two/Three/Four 

 The contestant was eliminated after their first time in the bottom two
 The contestant was eliminated after their second time in the bottom two
 The contestant was eliminated after their third time in the bottom two
 The contestant was eliminated after their fourth time in the bottom two
 The contestant was eliminated after their fifth time in the bottom two
 The contestant was eliminated in the final judging and placed third.
 The contestant was eliminated in the final judging and placed second.

Photo shoots

Episode 3 photo shoot: Polaroids (semifinals)
Episode 4 photo shoot: Hanging from a trapeze
Episode 5 photo shoot: Nude on the beach
Episode 6 photo shoot: Underwater mermaids
Episode 7 video shoot: Folk games
Episode 8 photo shoot: Figure skating
Episode 9 video shoot: Office madness
Episode 10 photo shoot: Elle Polska
Episode 11 photo shoot: Surfing on a sand dune
Episode 12 photo shoot: Haute couture on a beach
Episode 13 photo shoot: Animal print in the savanna
Episode 14 photo shoot: Glamour covers

Ratings

References

 

Top Model (Polish TV series)
2022 in Polish television